Kari Seitz  is an American professional soccer referee and the most experienced female referee in the World (out of the male and female referees)  She participated in four FIFA Women's World Cup tournaments in (1999, 2003, 2007 and 2011), as well as four  Olympic soccer tournaments (2004, 2008, 2012 and 2016) and is the only referee — man or woman — to do so.

In October 2013, she announced she would be retiring later in the month after a 28-year career.

At the request of FIFA, in 2016 she began managing training for Women's Soccer Referees worldwide.  She and her husband relocated to Switzerland in 2016 and she assumed her duties within the FIFA organization.

References

External links
 Michigan State University Alumni bio
 World Referee Bio

1970 births
Living people
American soccer referees
FIFA Women's World Cup referees
Olympic football referees
Football referees at the 2012 Summer Olympics
Women association football referees
Major League Soccer referees
American women referees and umpires